Cotachena pubescens is a moth in the family Crambidae. It was described by Warren in 1892. It is found in Taiwan, China, Indonesia, Bhutan and Thailand.

References

Moths described in 1892
Spilomelinae
Moths of Asia
Moths of Indonesia
Moths of Taiwan